Larkinella knui  is a Gram-negative, aerobic and motile bacterium from the genus of Larkinella which has been isolated from soil from the Jeju Island in Korea.

References 

Cytophagia
Bacteria described in 2018